Allan Livingstone (14 September 1928 – 10 January 1997) was an Australian sprint canoeist who competed in the early 1960s. He was eliminated in the semifinals of the K-1 4 × 500 m event at the 1960 Summer Olympics in Rome.

References
 
Grave of Allan Livingstone

External links
 
 
 

1928 births
1997 deaths
Australian male canoeists
Olympic canoeists of Australia
Canoeists at the 1960 Summer Olympics
20th-century Australian people